Zahidur Rahman Anjan is a Bangladeshi film director. He won a Bangladesh National Film Award for Best Director for his direction of the film Meghmallar (2014).

References

External links
 

Living people
Bangladeshi film directors
Best Director National Film Award (Bangladesh) winners
Year of birth missing (living people)
Best Dialogue National Film Award (Bangladesh) winners
Best Story National Film Award (Bangladesh) winners